Visa requirements for Libyan citizens are administrative entry restrictions by the authorities of other states placed on citizens of Libya.

As of 29 August 2021, Libyan citizens had visa-free or visa on arrival access to 62 countries and territories, ranking the Libyan passport 85th in terms of travel freedom (tied with the passports of Palestinian Territory and Sudan) according to the Henley Passport Index.

Visa requirements map

Visa requirements

Dependent, Disputed, or Restricted territories
Unrecognized or partially recognized countries

Dependent and autonomous territories

See also 

 Visa policy of Libya
 Libyan passport
 List of nationalities forbidden at border

References and Notes
References

Notes

Foreign relations of Libya
Libya